Puneet Sira is a British and Bollywood feature film director and producer who formed The Foundry which is actively developing and producing films.

His tenure at BBC Films launched his career as director, writer and producer. Since then, he's been the executive producer of Channel [V] for the Star TV Network. He's produced and directed several dramas for television and feature films including  I - Proud To Be An Indian (2004), Jai Veeru (2009) and Kisaan, (2009) for which he received a Best Director honor. Virat Kohli's Super V (2019), a Superhero animation series, directed by Puneet for Disney+, Marvel HQ, Star TV Network, Hotstar and Baweja Movies is the highest rated show in the animation bracket in India.

Biography
Early career
Sira started his career as an actor in the UK at the age of nine as a beggar boy in Annie Besant, The Warrior's Return(1977) as part of The Velvet Glove series for the BBC, directed by Philip Saville. Puneet went on to play in the feature film Arabian Adventure(1979). He played the lead role of Majeed, directed by Kevin Connor. In the same year Puneet played Kasava Minor in the BBC series To Serve Them All My Days (1979).

In 1980 Sira was the youngest member to participate in Comex 10, a commonwealth expedition sponsored by Prince Philip, Duke of Edinburgh. Founded by Lieutenant Colonel Lionel Gregory, OBE, Comex 10 was an expedition where 40 artistes from all commonwealth countries toured India performing variety acts in every city visited.

More acting work followed from How We Used to Live(Yorkshire Television), Why Couples Break Up (Yorkshire Television), London's Burning (London Weekend Television), The Moneymen (London Weekend Television), The Park (Regent Productions), The Betrothed (LIFS) and the highly acclaimed Walkers Poppadoms Commercial, The Rocking Sikh directed by Paul Weiland.

Film-making career
Sira became an assistant director at BBC Films Department on films such as Hallelujah Anyhow(1991) (Screen Two) starring Keith David, Sweet Nothing(1990) (Screen One) and Can You Hear Me Thinking?(1991) starring Judi Dench. He freelanced on Flying Colors (1993), Memsahib Rita (1994), Blue Baby (1994) before venturing into directing his own films like Strings (1996) which he also wrote and produced.

Sira was the director of the London Academy of Acting (a school founded by his father, Gurdial Sira in 1970), where he would teach acting for film. He set up an actors' agency, Talent Introduction Centre (T.I.C.), where he provided work for Asian actors in the UK.

Casting director was another title to Sira's credit: films such as Jinnah (1998) starring Christoper Lee, Flight(1992) (BBC Screen One), directed by Alex Pillai, Immaculate Conception (1992) directed by Jamil Dehlavi, Memsahib Rita (1994) and Frantz Fanon – Black Skin, White Mask (1996) directed by Isaac Julien. On the American feature film Passion in the Desert (1997) Sira worked on production.

Sira lectured on basic film making at Middlesex University and Italia Conti Acting Academy as a visiting lecturer.

In 1998, Sira became the executive producer for Rupert Murdoch's Channel V, (STAR TV), producing more than 22 television shows for the channel in Mumbai. He went on to produce and direct drama for television The Steal (2000) STAR TV, followed by Sanatta (2001) and Jataka Tales (2002) for Japanese television which Sira directed and produced with his partner Vikram Dhillon. Sira went on to direct the feature films I - Proud To Be An Indian  (2004), Jai Veeru (2009) and Kisaan (2009).

As a screenwriter Sira wrote I - Proud To Be An Indian with Vekeana Dhillon. Together they have written the screenplay for the feature film Kurbani for Feroz Khan (FK International) and Spiceboy for Miracle Films. Sira had written The Steal and Sanatta.

Sira and Vikram Dhillon are partners in The Foundry, a production company which has developed several feature films as well as several IP for the major OTT platforms globally

Filmography

AwardsSAFF Awards:

2009: SAFF Award for Direction (Kisaan)

References

External links
 

I Proud To Be An Indian @ Internet Movie DatabaseI Proud To Be An Indian @ Bollywood Hungama'' (IndiaFM)

Trailer of Jai Veeru

1967 births
Living people
British people of Punjabi descent
British film directors